Demetris Demetriou (born 15 January 1999) is a Cypriot professional footballer who plays as a goalkeeper for Cypriot club Apollon Limassol.

Club career

Anorthosis
Demetris Demetriou made his debut for Anorthosis in 2018.

Apollon Limassol
In July 2019, Demetris Demetriou joined Apollon Limassol.

International career
Demetriou made his national team debut on 13 October 2020 and kept a clean sheet in a draw against the Azerbaijan national football team.

Career statistics

Club

References

External links
Demetris Demetriou profile

1999 births
Living people
Cypriot footballers
Cyprus youth international footballers
Cyprus under-21 international footballers
Cyprus international footballers
Anorthosis Famagusta F.C. players
Apollon Limassol FC players
Association football goalkeepers